Slap or slapping may refer to:

Common use
 Slapping (strike), a method of striking with the palm of the hand

Instances of slapping
 George S. Patton slapping incidents
 Will Smith–Chris Rock slapping incident
 Slap (professional wrestling), an attack in professional wrestling
 Happy slapping, a British fad in the 2000s
 Power Slap, a 2023 US television show where contestants slap each other in the face

Music 
 Slap!, a 1990 album by English band Chumbawamba
 "Slap" (song), a 2006 song by American musician Ludacris 
 Slapping (music), a musical technique used with stringed instruments

Science 
 Secret large-scale atmospheric program, scientific term for chemtrail conspiracy theory, a set of conspiracy theories
 Standard Light Antarctic Precipitation, a reference material for stable isotope analysis

Other uses
 Saboted light armor penetrator, a family of ammunition designed to penetrate armor more efficiently than standard armor-piercing ammunition
 Slap (magazine), American skateboard magazine 1992–2008
 Slap, Tržič, a municipality in Slovenia
 SLAP tear, acronym derived from "superior labral tear from anterior to posterior", an injury to part of the shoulder blade

See also
 The Slap (disambiguation)
 Slap tagging or sticker art
 Slap tonguing, a musical technique used on wind instruments
 Strategic lawsuit against public participation, or SLAPP, a type of lawsuit